Darihak (also Romanized as Darīhak and Dereyḩak; also known as Darmaḩak and Duraihak) is a village in Cham Khalaf-e Isa Rural District, Cham Khalaf-e Isa District, Hendijan County, Khuzestan Province, Iran. At the time of the 2006 census, its population was 428, in 89 families.

References 

Populated places in Hendijan County